Melissa Bellucci (born 8 February 2001) is an Italian footballer who plays as midfielder for U.S. Sassuolo.

Career 
Belluci started playing football in Pedaso 1969, a males' football team in which she was the only female on the team. She moved to Jesina in 2016. Bellucci moved to Juventus in 2018. She made her first appearance for Juventus on 23 September, in a 6–0 victory against Verona. In 2020, she moved to Empoli.

International career 
On 14 June 2021, she made her first appearance for Italy in a 3–2 victory against Austria.

References 

Italian women's footballers
Italy women's international footballers
S.S.D. Empoli Ladies FBC players
Juventus F.C. (women) players
Living people
1999 births
Women's association football midfielders